Torneutes pallidipennis is a species of beetle in the family Cerambycidae, the only species in the genus Torneutes.

References

Torneutini
Monotypic beetle genera
Taxa named by Gottfried Christian Reich
Taxa described in 1837